Agustín Esteban Corradini (born 31 July 1984) is an Argentine retired field hockey player. He was a member of the national team and in May 2017, after coaching the junior team to a gold medal at the 2016 Women's Hockey Junior World Cup, he was appointed head coach of the Argentina women's national field hockey team. He became the head coach of the Belgian club Léopold first men's team in the summer of 2021.

References

External links
 

1984 births
Living people
Argentine field hockey coaches
Argentine male field hockey players
Field hockey players from Buenos Aires
South American Games gold medalists for Argentina
South American Games medalists in field hockey
Competitors at the 2006 South American Games
21st-century Argentine people